Devsar Assembly constituency is one of the 230 constituencies in the Madhya Pradesh Legislative Assembly of Madhya Pradesh a central state of India. Deosar is also part of Sidhi Lok Sabha constituency.

Members of the Legislative Assembly

See also
 Deosar
 Singrauli district
 List of constituencies of Madhya Pradesh Legislative Assembly

References

Assembly constituencies of Madhya Pradesh
Singrauli district